Mass surveillance in Iran looks into Iranian government surveillance of its citizens.

Surveillance technology 
According to a report by surveillance research group IPVM, Tiandy Technologies is selling surveillance technology to Iran's Revolutionary Guard, police, and military. The company sells cameras and AI-enabled software, such as facial recognition technology, software that claims to detect someone's race, and "smart" interrogation tables and "tiger chairs". According to reports, Tiandy has signed a five-year deal to supply video surveillance equipment to Iran. Iran has unveiled plans for a "social credit" system as well as its own "Great Firewall," which will allow the government to block foreign information as it sees fit.

Phone Apps for Mass Surveillance 
On 15 February 2018, The National Council of Resistance of Iran (NCRI) claimed that the country's Islamic Revolutionary Guard Corps and Ministry of Intelligence and Security are using a web of state-produced mobile phone applications to conduct "mass surveillance" of protesters and dissidents. The said spyware-enabled apps are available on Google Play, Apple Store, and GitHub.

VPN 
In March 2022, it was announced that using VPNs in Iran might become illegal under the new Iran Internet Law. On March 17, Article 19, along with more than 50 other organizations, including Amnesty International, Human Rights Watch, and Access Now, called on Iranian authorities and those in bilateral talks with the country to pressure the Iranian parliament to repeal the 'User Protection Bill.' Foreign tech companies operating in Iran, such as Facebook, Instagram, YouTube, and Twitter, will be required to follow all of the Bill's provisions, appoint a representative in the country, and submit the identification and history of their users' activities to the government upon request. Platforms that do not comply with the government's requirements will face bandwidth limiting and bans.

Human Rights and Iranian Internet Bill 
A group of human rights organizations criticized Iran's attempts to impose extensive censorship and governmental control over the country's internet infrastructure. In March 2022, the Iranian Parliament approved the "draconian" Regulatory System for Cyberspace Services Bill — formerly known as the User Protection Bill. If passed, it "would violate an array of human rights of Iranians, including the right to freedom of expression and right to privacy." Human Rights Watch, Amnesty International, the Committee to Protect Journalists, Global Voices, and other rights organizations signed a joint statement urging Tehran to "immediately withdraw the measure in its entirety."

Iran Intranet 
On 24 August 2020, several members of the Iranian Majlis Parliament submitted a proposal to the parliament's presidium to "organize social media," highlighting the importance of replacing foreign messaging applications with native ones. On 7 September 2020, it was reported that if Internet platforms do not comply with the Islamic Republic's laws and regulations, they will be censored.

References 

Mass surveillance
Mass media in Iran
Human rights abuses in Iran